Yasmin Clydsdale (née Meakes; born 25 March 1994) is an Australian professional rugby league and rugby union footballer who currently plays for the Newcastle Knights in the NRL Women's Premiership. She previously played for the Sydney Roosters in the NRLW and the Central Coast Roosters in the NSWRL Women's Premiership.

Rugby union career
Clydsdale made her international rugby 7s debut in 2017. She played a key role for the 7s team taking home bronze in the 2018 Women's Rugby 7's World Cup.

Rugby league career
Clydsdale made her NRLW debut for the Sydney Roosters in the 2020 NRLW season. She would later go on to play in the Roosters grand final losing team to the Brisbane Broncos where she scored a try.

On 13 November 2020, she made her State of Origin debut for New South Wales in their loss to Queensland.

She played in the Roosters' 2021 Grand Final win over the St. George Illawarra Dragons and scored a try.

In June 2022, she signed with the Newcastle Knights for the 2022 season. She made her club debut for the Knights in round 1 of the 2022 NRLW season against the Brisbane Broncos.

On 2 October 2022, Clydsdale played in the Knights' 2022 NRLW Grand Final win over the Parramatta Eels, scoring a try in the Knights' 32-12 victory.

References

External links
Newcastle Knights profile
Sydney Roosters profile
Rugby.com.au profile

1994 births
Living people
Australian female rugby league players
Australia women's national rugby league team players
Rugby league second-rows
Rugby league wingers
Sydney Roosters (NRLW) players
Newcastle Knights (NRLW) players
Australian female rugby sevens players